October 8 marks the day of the flag of Salta, Argentina, in recognition of the creation of the province in 1814, when Gervasio Posadas, Supreme Director of the United Provinces of the Río de la Plata, issued the decree that established the creation of the Governor of Salta. That act was unrelated to the government of Tucumán and became a province, also shaped by the territory of Jujuy Province, Oran, Tarija, and Santa Maria.  

The design of the flag of Salta has the following components: a six-pointed star of dubious origin, similar to the Jewish Star of David, the coat of arms of the province, the traditional colors of the poncho of Salta (similar to the Infernales led by Martín Miguel de Güemes) arranged in a horizontal band representing the 23 departments by stars like the gaucho spur called the Nazarene. The flag of Salta was established by Law No. 6946 in 1996, after the contest that called for designs was won by the students in the 7th "A" School Nicolás Avellaneda.

External links
 Official website of the government of Salta

Salta
Salta Province
Salta